DME (3,4-dimethoxy-beta-hydroxyphenethylamine) is a lesser-known psychedelic drug.  It is the beta-hydroxy derivative of 3,4-dimethoxyphenethylamine. DME was first synthesized by Alexander Shulgin. In his book PiHKAL, the minimum dosage is listed as 115 mg, and the duration unknown. DME produces few to no effects. Very little data exists about the pharmacological properties, metabolism, and toxicity of DME.

Legality

United Kingdom
This substance is a Class A drug in the Drugs controlled by the UK Misuse of Drugs Act.

See also 
 Phenethylamine
 Psychedelics, dissociatives and deliriants

References 

Psychedelic phenethylamines
Phenylethanolamines